Baby Boom (我家四个宝) is a Singaporean TV series aired on MediaCorp Channel 8 in 2003.

Synopsis
Tim and Kim are a yuppie married couple who would rather pursue a stylish lifestyle than start a family. They both have successful careers as a company executive and a director respectively. However they discover that they are unable to connect with other family members and friends who are already married or have children. Kim later discovers she is expecting quadruplets.

Cast
Li Nanxing as Tim
Zoe Tay as Kim
Gurmit Singh as Adam
Mai Haowei as Kim's father
Li Yinzhu as Chen A-Mei 陈阿美, Kim's mother
Zen Chong as James, Kim's brother
Pan Lingling as Lu Xiaofen 卢晓纷, Adam's wife
Liang Tian as Cai Mingzheng 蔡铭政, Tim's father
Hong Huifang as Cai Jingwen 蔡静文, Tim's older sister
Li Wenhai as Song Junyu 宋君宇, Jingwen's husband
Michelle Saram as Kristen
Zhu Houren as Colin

2003 Accolades

External links
Baby Boom (English)
Baby Boom (Chinese)
Baby Boom (mewatch)

Singapore Chinese dramas
2003 Singaporean television series debuts
2003 Singaporean television series endings
2000s Singaporean television series
Channel 8 (Singapore) original programming